Hreljin Vidauct is located between the Vrata and Oštrovica interchanges of the A6 motorway in Primorje-Gorski Kotar County, Croatia, just to the west of Tuhobić Tunnel. The viaduct consists of two parallel structures: The first one was completed in 1995 by Hidroelektra, and the second one in 2008 by Konstruktor. The viaduct is tolled within the A6 motorway ticket system and there are no separate toll plazas associated with use of the viaduct. The viaduct was designed by Hidroelektra.

Structure description
At this location the motorway route follows a horizontal curve of  radius. Transversal grade of the deck is constant and equal to 6%, while elevation grade of the viaduct is constant at 3.3%, sloping towards Oštrovica interchange. The viaduct is a box girder structure supporting the superstructure across 11 spans:  + 9 x  + .

The two parallel structures were executed using different construction methods: The original superstructure, built by Hidroelektra, was executed in  prefabricated concrete elements glued together with an epoxy resin. The newer structure, built by Konstruktor, was built using incremental launching and, unlike the first superstructure, starts from the side closer to Vrata. This method was preferred since the construction method applied during the construction of the original structure proved cumbersome.

Traffic volume
Traffic is regularly counted and reported by Autocesta Rijeka–Zagreb, operator of the viaduct and the A6 motorway where the structure is located, and published by Hrvatske ceste. Substantial variations between annual (AADT) and summer (ASDT) traffic volumes are attributed to the fact that the bridge carries substantial tourist traffic to the Adriatic resorts. The traffic count is performed using analysis of motorway toll ticket sales.

See also
List of bridges by length

References

Box girder bridges
Bridges completed in 1995
Toll bridges in Croatia
Viaducts in Croatia
Buildings and structures in Primorje-Gorski Kotar County
Transport in Primorje-Gorski Kotar County